Dimethoxyamphetamine (DMA) is a series of six lesser-known psychedelic drugs similar in structure to the three isomers of methoxyamphetamine and six isomers of trimethoxyamphetamine. The isomers are 2,3-DMA, 2,4-DMA, 2,5-DMA, 2,6-DMA, 3,4-DMA, and 3,5-DMA. Three of the isomers were characterized by Alexander Shulgin in his book PiHKAL. Little is known about their dangers or toxicity.

Positional isomers

2,4-DMA

 Dosage: 60 mg or greater
 Duration: "Probably short."
 Effects: stimulative, amphetamine-like effects

2,5-DMA

2,5-DMA is the alpha-methyl homologue of 2C-H and could be called "DOH" under the DO naming scheme.
 Dosage: 80–160 mg
 Duration: 6–8 hours
 Effects: Mydriasis, increase in heart rate
 History: 2,5-DMA was first synthesized in Tuckahoe, New York by Richard Baltzly and Johannes S. Buck in 1939.

3,4-DMA

 Dosage: 160 milligrams orally
 Duration: unknown
 Effects: Mescaline-like visuals
 History: Experiments on psychiatric patients who were given 3,4-DMA at dosages of 70 mg to 700 mg by IV injection took place at the New York State Psychiatric Institute and other places in the early 1960s and were carried out by the U.S. Army's chemical warfare group while researching many potentially weaponizable drugs probably as part of the Edgewood Arsenal experiments. The Edgewood Arsenal code name for 3,4-DMA was EA-1316.

Note that two other positional isomers of dimethoxyamphetamine, 2,6-DMA and 3,5-DMA, have also been made, but these drugs have not been tested in humans and their effects are unknown. However, it is likely that these compounds would also produce amphetamine-like stimulation or possibly hallucinogenic effects.

Legal status

United States
2,5-Dimethoxyamphetamine is listed as a Scheduled I controlled substance at the federal level in the United States and is therefore illegal to buy, possess, and sell. 2,4-dimethoxyamphetamine, 2,6-dimethoxyamphetamine, 3,4-dimethoxyamphetamine, and 3,5-dimethoxyamphetamine are each position isomers of 2,5-dimethoxyamphetamine, they are therefore all Schedule I controlled substances as well.

Australia
DMA is considered a Schedule 9 prohibited substance in Australia under the Poisons Standard (October 2015). A Schedule 9 substance is a substance which may be abused or misused, the manufacture, possession, sale or use of which should be prohibited by law except when required for medical or scientific research, or for analytical, teaching or training purposes with approval of Commonwealth and/or State or Territory Health Authorities.

New Zealand
DMA is considered a Class A controlled drug under the Misuse of Drugs Act 1975.

See also 
 2,5-dimethoxyphenethylamine (2C-H)
 Trimethoxyamphetamine (TMA)
 3-Methoxyamphetamine
 4-Methoxyamphetamine

References

External links 
 2,4-DMA Entry in PiHKAL
 2,4-DMA Entry in PiHKAL • info
 2,5-DMA Entry in PiHKAL
 2,5-DMA Entry in PiHKAL • info
 3,4-DMA Entry in PiHKAL
 3,4-DMA Entry in PiHKAL • info

Substituted amphetamines
Phenol ethers